Provaglio d'Iseo is a town and comune in the province of Brescia, in the Lombardy region in Italy. Provaglio d'Iseo is located 3 km south of the town Iseo, in the historical region of Franciacorta, famous for its wine production.

Points of interest include the monastery of San Pietro in Lamosa and the nearby Torbiere Sebine, a natural marshland area, important for birds.

References

Cities and towns in Lombardy